The  IIFA Best Action is a technical award chosen ahead of the ceremonies.

The winners are listed below:-

See also 
 IIFA Awards
 Bollywood
 Cinema of India

References

External links
 2008 winners 

International Indian Film Academy Awards